Saint Zacharias of Vienne, also sometimes Zachary or Zachariah, was traditionally the second Bishop of Vienne in what is now Isère, France, until he was supposedly martyred in 106 AD during the reign of the Emperor Trajan.   He was one of the first Christian evangelists in France.
He is venerated locally and is one of the patron saints of the city of Vienne. His feast day is celebrated on 26 May.

Historicity
Some doubt the historicity of Zacharias, as Verus, the fourth bishop of Vienne, is documented in the year 314, thus making it unlikely that the second bishop could have worked as early as the reign of Trajan.

Life
The tradition is that Zacharias lived in Vienne at the end of the first century, where the people elected him to be their second bishop. Since Christianity was forbidden in the Roman Empire, he was martyred there in 106 by the Prefect Pompey on the orders of the Emperor Trajan.

Veneration
Having a local veneration, Saint Zacharias is one of the patron saints of the city of Vienne. His cult was confirmed by the Roman Catholic Church and his feast day is celebrated on 26 May.

Notes and references

Sources
 Zeno.org: Zacharias 
 Johannes Hofmann: Zacharias von Vienne. In: Biographisch-Bibliographisches Kirchenlexikon (BBKL), Band 14, col. 307. Bautz, Herzberg 1998 

106 deaths
Gallo-Roman saints
2nd-century Christian martyrs
2nd-century bishops in Gaul
Year of birth unknown